Vines is a surname. It may refer to:
 
 David Vines (born 1949), Australian economist
 Duncan Vines (1869-1950), English cricketer and Royal Indian Navy officer
 Ellsworth Vines (1911–1994), American tennis player 
 Harry Vines (1938–2006), American basketball coach
 Jerry Vines (born 1937), American preacher and pastor
 John Vines (born 1949), American lieutenant-general
 Josephus C. Vines (1873-1964), American politician
 Sherard Vines (1890–1974), English writer
 Sydney Howard Vines (1849–1934),  British botanist
 Graham Vines (born 1930),  British cyclist

See also
 Vine (surname), Vine